The Head of a Warrior is a recurring theme in art.  The heads vary a great deal across time and artistic style, but all present an intriguing look into both the soldier and the artist of the day.

External links
 Head of a Warrior by Pablo Picasso
 A109 from the Second Temple of Hera  at the Argive Heraion.
 Greek severe Style from Joetourist. (Description)
 Roman Head of a Warrior

Military art
Iconography